This family represents the Kaposi's sarcoma-associated herpesvirus (KSHV) internal ribosome entry site (IRES) present in the vCyclin gene. The vCyclin and vFLIP coding sequences are present on a bicistronic transcript and it is thought the IRES may initiate translation of vFLIP from this bicistronic transcript.

References

External links 
 

Cis-regulatory RNA elements